"You Don't Know " is a 1961 single by Helen Shapiro. It was written by John Schroeder and Mike Hawker and released on the Columbia (EMI) label in the United Kingdom on 29 June 1961. "You Don't Know" topped the UK Singles Chart for three weeks beginning on 10 August. The single sold over a million copies and earned Shapiro a gold disc.

International chart positions

Cover versions
In Japan, where Shapiro's version also became popular in 1962, the song was covered in Japanese by Mieko Hirota, who had also covered Shapiro's earlier hit "Don't Treat Me Like a Child."

References

1961 singles
Helen Shapiro songs
Songs written by John Schroeder (musician)
Columbia Graphophone Company singles
1961 songs
Song recordings produced by Norrie Paramor
Songs written by Mike Hawker (songwriter)
Irish Singles Chart number-one singles
Number-one singles in New Zealand
UK Singles Chart number-one singles